The Former Cathedral of Baeza, or in full the Cathedral of the Assumption of the Virgin of Baeza (?formerly Catedral de la Natividad de Nuestra Señora de Baeza), is a Roman Catholic church in Baeza, Andalusia, southern Spain. The cathedral is located in the Plaza de Santa Maria.

History 

It was the cathedral episcopal see of the Roman Catholic Diocese of Baeza, which has a Visigothic period, was suppressed after some time under Moorish rule and was shortly restored after the Reconquista under the Kingdom of Castile in the thirteenth century, but suppressed for good, never again to regain (co-)cathedral status.

The site, like the land, alternated between mosque and church during 12th and 13th centuries. The apse still maintains Gothic tracery, but in the 16th-century a major reconstruction by Andrés de Vandelvira in Renaissance-style created the present church. The construction of the cathedral finally ended in 1593, shortly after the death of Andrés de Vandelvira.

The church forms part of a UNESCO World Heritage Site with other monuments in Baeza and in the nearby city of Úbeda. The cathedral was one of 100 nominees to be voted as the 12 Treasures of Spain in 2007. It's also listed among the Shrines in the Extraordinary Jubilee of Mercy.

References

Sources and external links 
 GCatholic - former cathedral, with Google satellite photo/map
 Baeza Cathedral Official Website 

16th-century Roman Catholic church buildings in Spain
Roman Catholic cathedrals in Andalusia
Baeza
Gothic architecture in Andalusia
Renaissance architecture in Andalusia